Andrew "Andy" Joseph Feichtinger was an American football end who played for one season for the Decatur Staleys of the National Football League. He never attended any college.

External links
Andy Feichtinger Bio (Staley Museum)

References

1897 births
1962 deaths
American football ends
Decatur Staleys players
Sportspeople from Salem, Oregon
Players of American football from Oregon